Connie A. Woodhouse is a regents professor at the University of Arizona who is known for her use of tree rings to reconstruct the hydroclimate of the past, especially in western North America. In 2022 she was elected a fellow of the American Geophysical Union

Education and career 
Woodhouse has a B.A. from Prescott College (1979), an M.S. from the University of Utah (1989), and a Ph.D. from the University of Arizona (1996). Following her Ph.D., Woodhouse worked at the University of Colorado Boulder until 2007 when she moved to the University of Arizona as an associate professor. In 2013 she was named professor in the School of Geography and Development, and in 2020 she was named a regents professor.

Research 
Woodhouse's early research examined the long-term variability in drought conditions in the United States. She has used dating with tree rings to examine the flow of water and snow levels in Colorado. Her research extends into considerations of air temperature, the efficiency of stream runoff, and flash droughts. Her work on droughts in the past has indicated the potential of Dust Bowl conditions in the future. Thus, her work on past climate has implication for the future impact of drought conditions

Selected publications

Awards and honors 
In 2016, Woodhouse received the José A. Boninsegna Frontiers in Dendrochronology Award in recognition of her work in reconstructing past climates and for sharing this information with people who manage water resources. In 2022 Woodhouse was elected a fellow of the American Geophysical Union.

References

External links 

 

Living people
Women climatologists
Prescott College alumni
University of Utah alumni
University of Arizona faculty
Hydrologists
Year of birth missing (living people)